Rita Mitsouko is the début studio album by the French pop rock group Les Rita Mitsouko. It was released in April 1984 and includes the singles "Restez Avec Moi" and "Marcia Baïla".

The album was recorded with veteran producer Conny Plank at Conny's Studio, Köln, Germany, and Studio Rita Mitsouko, Paris, with overdubs in Conny's Place. Receiving positive reviews, the album was originally released as an LP, cassette and CD in April 1984. CD editions include five bonus tracks. The artwork was designed by Les Rita Mitsouko and Atiai with photography by Bernard Pichon and Jean-Louis Sautreau.

At the time of release the group was simply called Rita Mitsouko. In the interim between the début and 1986's The No Comprendo, Catherine Ringer and Fred Chichin amended their name, adding 'Les' to 'Rita Mitsouko'. The decision was made to negate the possibility that audiences would identify the name as referring to Catherine Ringer only as opposed to a musical group.

Singles
"Restez Avec Moi" preceded the release of the album but failed to chart. It was backed with "Dans la Steppe", a song that was later re-recorded by the group and issued with the shortened title "La Steppe" on 1993's Système D.

"Marcia Baïla" became a surprise hit single in France the spring of 1985. The song had a long chart trajectory, remaining on the Top 50 charts for 29 weeks. It debuted at #33 on April 27, 1985, and climbed regularly until it peaked at #2 for three consecutive weeks. In all, it spent 17 weeks in the Top Ten.  The song was Rita Mitsouko's first big hit and propelled them to considerable fame.

Reception

Rita Mitsouko received positive reviews from the majority of critics.

The French edition of Rolling Stone magazine named this album the 20th greatest French rock album (out of 100).

Track listing

Personnel
 Musicians
 Fred Chichin - Framus, Telecaster, Fender Coronado, Höfner, Oberheim, Vcs3, emulator, rhythm computer, drums, tambourine, bells
 Catherine Ringer - vocals, Elka Rhapsody, organ, piano, Oberheim, Vcs3, Arp, Höfner, Framus, Spanish guitar, rhythm computer, drums

 Technical and visual
 Conny Plank, Rita Mitsouko - producer
 Conny Plank, Fred Chichin, Dave Hutchins - recording
 Conny Plank, Dave Hutchins - overdubs
 Rita Mitsouko, Atiai - cover concept, artwork
 Atiai - neon design, back cover coloriseur, front cover, thanks for use of his rhythm computer
 Jean-Louis Sautreau - back cover photography
 Bernard Pichon - front cover photography
 Jade House Ltd., Mankin Industries - management

External links
Rita Mitsouko release history
"Marcia Baïla" release history

References

1984 debut albums
Albums produced by Conny Plank
Virgin Records albums
Les Rita Mitsouko albums